Yorton railway station serves the villages of Yorton and Clive in Shropshire, England. It is 7¼ miles (11.5 km) north of Shrewsbury on the Welsh Marches Line towards Crewe. It has two platforms and dates from 1858. Trains only stop here upon request.

The station was designated for the axe in Dr Beeching's "The Reshaping of British Railways" in the 1960s; however it was ultimately saved.

Facilities
The station is unstaffed and has no ticket provision (so these must be bought on the train or in advance); the old buildings still stand but are now privately owned.  There are shelters on both sides and train running information is provided via CIS displays, a customer help point on platform 1, a payphone on platform 2 and timetable poster boards.  Step-free access is available only on the southbound platform.

Services
Monday to Saturdays there is generally a two-hourly service from Yorton southbound to Shrewsbury and northbound to Crewe.  Two of these in each direction (weekdays only) run to/from Swansea via the Heart of Wales Line. Some early morning and late evening express services between Manchester Piccadilly and Cardiff Central also call here. On Sundays, Yorton is served by five trains in each direction, most starting from or finishing at Manchester Piccadilly or Cardiff Central. A normal weekday service operates on most Bank holidays.

All trains that stop here only do so on request. This means that any passengers wishing to alight at the station must inform the conductor on the train to arrange with the driver for the train to stop. Any passengers wishing to get on at the station must make their intent clear to the driver.

References

Bibliography

External links

Railway stations in Shropshire
DfT Category F2 stations
Former London and North Western Railway stations
Railway stations in Great Britain opened in 1858
Railway stations served by Transport for Wales Rail
Railway request stops in Great Britain